Buddhism is one of the largest religions of Greece.  It has existed in Greece since antiquity. Today, there is a sizable Buddhist community in Greece, comprising immigrants and native Greek converts. Buddhism has influenced Greek literary tradition to some extent, as evident in the works of Nikos Kazantzakis.

History 

Buddhism and Greek culture share a history of more than 2,000 years. Greek was one of the first languages ​​in which part of the Buddha’s teachings was recorded, long before the pali canon Again, in the famous columns and inscriptions of the Indian Emperor Ashoka.  Greeks were the first Europeans to embrace Buddhism centuries before the advent of Christianity, and there is strong evidence that the first sculptors to depict the Buddha in the form of statues were of Greek descent. Buddhism flourished under the Indo-Greeks, leading to the Greco-Buddhist cultural syncretism. The arts of the Indian sub-continent were also quite affected by Hellenistic art during and after these interactions. (Hellenistic influence on Indian art). The iconography of Vajrapani is clearly that of the hero Heracles, with varying degrees of hybridization.

Menander I was one of the patrons of Buddhism, he also was the subject of the Milinda Panha.

Mahadharmaraksita was a Greek Buddhist master, who according to Mahāvaṃsa traveled to Anuradhapura in Sri Lanka together with 30,000 Greek Buddhist monks from Alexandria of the Caucasus.
In addition, Mahāvaṃsa mention how early Buddhists from Sri Lanka went to Alexandria of the Caucasus to learn Buddhism.

The Kandahar Greek Edicts of Ashoka, which are among the Ashoka's Major Rock Edicts of the Indian Emperor Ashoka were written in the Greek language. In addition, the Kandahar Bilingual Rock Inscription was written in Greek and Aramaic. Ashoka used the word "eusebeia" (piety) as a Greek translation for the central Buddhist and Hindu concept of "dharma" in the Kandahar Bilingual Rock Inscription.

Ptolemy II Philadelphus is also mentioned in the Edicts of Ashoka as a recipient of the Buddhist proselytism of Ashoka:

Buddhist gravestones from the Ptolemaic Egypt have been found in Alexandria decorated with depictions of the dharma wheel, showing the presence of Buddhists in Hellenistic Egypt.

Buddhist manuscripts in cursive Greek, dated later than the second century AD, have been found in Afghanistan. Some mention the "Lokesvararaja Buddha" (λωγοασφαροραζοβοδδο).

Artistic influences

Numerous works of Greco-Buddhist art display the intermixing of Greek and Buddhist influences in such creation centers as Gandhara. The subject matter of Gandharan art was definitely Buddhist, while most motifs were of Western Asiatic or Hellenistic origin.

Anthropomorphic representation of the Buddha

Although there is still some debate, the first anthropomorphic representations of the Buddha himself are often considered a result of the Greco-Buddhist interaction. Before this innovation, Buddhist art was "aniconic": the Buddha was only represented through his symbols (an empty throne, the Bodhi Tree, Buddha footprints, the Dharmachakra).

This reluctance towards anthropomorphic representations of the Buddha, and the sophisticated development of aniconic symbols to avoid it (even in narrative scenes where other human figures would appear), seem to be connected to one of the Buddha's sayings reported in the Digha Nikaya that discouraged representations of himself after the extinction of his body.

Probably not feeling bound by these restrictions, and because of "their cult of form, the Greeks were the first to attempt a sculptural representation of the Buddha". In many parts of the Ancient World, the Greeks did develop syncretic divinities, that could become a common religious focus for populations with different traditions: a well-known example is Serapis, introduced by Ptolemy I Soter in Egypt, who combined aspects of Greek and Egyptian Gods. In India as well, it was only natural for the Greeks to create a single common divinity by combining the image of a Greek god-king (Apollo, or possibly the deified founder of the Indo-Greek Kingdom, Demetrius I of Bactria), with the traditional physical characteristics of the Buddha.

Many of the stylistic elements in the representations of the Buddha point to Greek influence: himation, the contrapposto stance of the upright figures, such as the first–second century Gandhara standing Buddhas, the stylized curly hair and ushnisha apparently derived from the style of the Apollo Belvedere (330 BC) and the measured quality of the faces, all rendered with strong artistic realism. A large quantity of sculptures combining Buddhist and purely Hellenistic styles and iconography were excavated at the modern site of Hadda, Afghanistan. The curly hair of Buddha is described in the famous list of the physical characteristics of the Buddha in the Buddhist sutras. The hair with curls turning to the right is first described in the Pāli canon; we find the same description in the Dāsāṣṭasāhasrikā prajñāpāramitā.

Greek artists were most probably the authors of these early representations of the Buddha, in particular the standing statues, which display "a realistic treatment of the folds and on some even a hint of modelled volume that characterizes the best Greek work. This is Classical or Hellenistic Greek, not archaizing Greek transmitted by Persia or Bactria, nor distinctively Roman."

The Greek stylistic influence on the representation of the Buddha, through its idealistic realism, also permitted a very accessible, understandable and attractive visualization of the ultimate state of enlightenment described by Buddhism, allowing it to reach a wider audience:

During the following centuries, this anthropomorphic representation of the Buddha defined the canon of Buddhist art, but progressively evolved to incorporate more Indian and Asian elements.

Hellenized Buddhist pantheon

Several other Buddhist deities may have been influenced by Greek gods. For example, Heracles with a lion-skin, the protector deity of Demetrius I of Bactria, "served as an artistic model for Vajrapani, a protector of the Buddha". In Japan, this expression further translated into the wrath-filled and muscular Niō guardian gods of the Buddha, standing today at the entrance of many Buddhist temples.

According to Katsumi Tanabe, professor at Chūō University, Japan, besides Vajrapani, Greek influence also appears in several other gods of the Mahayana pantheon such as the Japanese Fūjin, inspired from the Greek divinity Boreas through the Greco-Buddhist Wardo, or the mother deity Hariti inspired by Tyche.

In addition, forms such as garland-bearing cherubs, vine scrolls, and such semihuman creatures as the centaur and triton, are part of the repertory of Hellenistic art introduced by Greco-Roman artists in the service of the Kushan court.

Scriptures
Evidence of direct religious interaction between Greek and Buddhist thought during the period include the Milinda Pañha or "Questions of Menander", a Pali-language discourse in the Platonic style held between Menander I and the Arahath Buddhist monk Nagasena.

Several Buddhist dedications by Greeks in India are recorded, such as that of the Greek meridarch (civil governor of a province) named Theodorus, describing in Kharosthi how he enshrined relics of the Buddha. The inscriptions were found on a vase inside a stupa, dated to the reign of Menander or one of his successors in the 1st century BC. Finally, Buddhist tradition recognizes Menander as one of the great benefactors of the faith, together with Ashoka and Kanishka the Great.

Buddhist manuscripts in cursive Greek have been found in Afghanistan, praising various Buddhas and including mentions of the Mahayana figure of "Lokesvararaja Buddha". These manuscripts have been dated later than the 2nd century AD.

Present day 
There are many Buddhist centers in Greece, four centers founded by the Diamond Way and other centers in cities such as Athens, Thessaloniki, Sparta and Rhodes.  The Athens Diamond Way Buddhist Center was founded in 1975 when Lama Ole Nydahl visited Athens for the first time. There are also Buddhist retreats in Corinth and on Mount Olympus, and nine stupas.

Gallery

Bibliography 
 Richard Foltz, Religions of the Silk Road, 2nd edition, New York: Palgrave Macmillan, 2010 ISBN 978-0-230-62125-1
 The Diffusion of Classical Art in Antiquity by John Boardman (Princeton University Press, 1994) ISBN 0-691-03680-2
 The Shape of Ancient Thought. Comparative studies in Greek and Indian Philosophies by Thomas McEvilley (Allworth Press and the School of Visual Arts, 2002) ISBN 1-58115-203-5
 Old World Encounters: Cross-cultural contacts and exchanges in pre-modern times by Jerry H.Bentley (Oxford University Press, 1993) ISBN 0-19-507639-7
 Alexander the Great: East-West Cultural contacts from Greece to Japan (NHK and Tokyo National Museum, 2003)
 Living Zen by Robert Linssen (Grove Press New York, 1958) ISBN 0-8021-3136-0
 Echoes of Alexander the Great: Silk route portraits from Gandhara by Marian Wenzel, with a foreword by the Dalai Lama (Eklisa Anstalt, 2000) ISBN 1-58886-014-0
 "When the Greeks Converted the Buddha: Asymmetrical Transfers of Knowledge in Indo-Greek Cultures" by Georgios T. Halkias, In Trade and Religions: Religious Formation, Transformation and Cross-Cultural Exchange between East and West, ed. Volker Rabens. Brill Publishers, 2013: 65-115. 
 The Edicts of King Asoka: An English Rendering by Ven. S. Dhammika (The Wheel Publication No. 386/387) 
 Mahayana Buddhism, The Doctrinal Foundations, Paul Williams, Routledge, ISBN 0-415-02537-0
 The Greeks in Bactria and India, W.W. Tarn, South Asia Books, ISBN 81-215-0220-9
 “The shape of ancient thought. Comparative Studies in Greek and Indian philosophies”, by Thomas Mc Evilly (Allworth Press, New York 2002) 
 
 Ihsan Ali and Muhammad Naeem Qazi, Gandharan Sculptures in Peshawar Museum, Hazara University, Mansehra.
 Alfred Foucher, 1865-1952; Ecole française d'Extrême-Orient, L'art gréco-bouddhique du Gandhâra : étude sur les origines de l'influence classique dans l'art bouddhique de l'Inde et de l'Extrême-Orient (1905), Paris : E. Leroux.

See also 

 Kalachakra Stupa (Greece)
 Greco-Buddhism
 Greco-Buddhist monasticism
 Greco-Buddhist Art
 Milinda Panha
 List of Buddhists
 Buddhism in Europe
 Buddhism in the West

References

External links 
Theravada Buddhist Center in Greece
Diamond Way Buddhism in Greece
 UNESCO: Threatened Greco-Buddhist art
‘’The Questions of King Milinda’’ translated by Thomas William Rhys Davids.
The Debate of King Milinda, Most Recent HTML and PDF Editions.
 Alexander the Great: East-West Cultural contacts from Greece to Japan (Japanese)
 The Hellenistic age
 The Kanishka Buddhist coins
 Interim period: Mathura as the Vaishnava-Buddhist seat of culture and learning

Buddhism in Greece
Buddhism in Europe
Buddhism by country
Religion in Greece